DXMM (927 AM) is a radio station owned and operated by Sulu-Tawi-Tawi Broadcasting Foundation, the media arm of the Apostolic Vicariate of Jolo. The station's studio is located at Kasulutan Village, Brgy. Gandasuli, Jolo, Sulu in the Philippines.

References

Radio stations in the Philippines
Catholic radio stations